NGC 4744 is a barred lenticular galaxy located about 160 million light-years away in the constellation Centaurus. NGC 4744 was discovered by astronomer John Herschel on June 8, 1834. It is a member of the Centaurus Cluster.

See also 
 List of NGC objects (4001–5000)
 NGC 4340

References

External links

Centaurus (constellation)
Barred lenticular galaxies
4744 
43661 
Centaurus Cluster
Astronomical objects discovered in 1834